The Alliance for Health Policy and Systems Research (the Alliance) is an international partnership hosted at World Health Organization Headquarters that works to improve the health of those in low- and middle-income countries by supporting the generation and use of evidence that strengthens health systems.

History 
Following on from recommendations of the 1996 WHO Ad Hoc Committee on Health Research, which recognised the role of research in strengthening health policies and the overall development of health systems, a group of global health leaders — including senior scientists, policy makers and representatives of various agencies and programs with a stake in health policy and systems research — met at Lejondal, Sweden. At that meeting, the experts agreed on the need to create a body that would address areas of health policy and systems research. Although it took almost two years after that meeting, the Alliance was officially founded in 1999. Since then its main objective has not shifted significantly.

Organization and governance 
The Alliance has a small secretariat hosted at the World Health Organization Headquarters in Geneva, Switzerland. The Secretariat manages the day-to-day implementation of the Alliance workplan. The work of the Secretariat is overseen by both the Alliance Board, which is the governing body of the Alliance, and the Alliance Scientific and Technical Advisory Committee (STAC), which is responsible for providing scientific and technical advice to the Board and Secretariat.

The Alliance mainly works through issuing and managing grants that achieve its four core objectives:
 Stimulate the generation and synthesis of policy-relevant health systems knowledge, encompassing evidence, tools and methods 
 Promote the dissemination and use of health policy and systems knowledge to improve the performance of health systems 
 Facilitate the development of capacity for the generation, dissemination and use of HPSR knowledge among researchers, policy-makers and other stakeholders

For example, it is a core sponsor of the biennial Health Systems Research Symposium organized by Health Systems Global. It also has been involved in developing or commissioning a wide range of reports, guidelines, and journal articles that advance the field of HPSR.

References 

World Health Organization
Health research